Euglenes is a genus of ant-like leaf beetles in the family Aderidae. There are about five described species in Euglenes.

Species
These six species belong to the genus Euglenes:
 Euglenes nitidifrons Thomson, 1886 g
 Euglenes oculatissimus (Wollaston, 1864) g
 Euglenes oculatus (Paykull, 1798)
 Euglenes pygmaeus De Geer, 1775 g b
 Euglenes serricornis Reitter, 1885 g
 Euglenes wollastoni Israelson, 1971 g
Data sources: i = ITIS, c = Catalogue of Life, g = GBIF, b = Bugguide.net

References

Further reading

External links

 

Aderidae